Vladimir Marković is a Professor of Mathematics at University of Oxford. He was previously the John D. MacArthur Professor at the California Institute of Technology (2013–2020) and Sadleirian Professor of Pure Mathematics at the University of Cambridge (2013–2014).

Education
Marković was educated at the University of Belgrade where he was awarded a Bachelor of Science degree in 1995 and a PhD in 1998.

Career and research
Previously, Marković has held positions at the University of Warwick, Stony Brook University and the University of Minnesota. Marković is editor of Proceedings of the London Mathematical Society.

Marković's research interests are in low-dimensional geometry, topology and dynamics and functional and geometric analysis.

Awards and honours
Marković was elected a Fellow of the Royal Society (FRS) in 2014. His nomination reads: 

Marković was also awarded the Clay Research Award in 2012, Whitehead Prize and Philip Leverhulme Prize in 2004.

In Fall of 2015 Marković worked as an Institute for Advanced Study member. In 2016 he received a Simons Investigator Award.

References

External links
Caltech: Markovic Elected to Great Britain's Royal Society

Living people
Serbian mathematicians
20th-century American mathematicians
Fellows of the Royal Society
Royal Society Wolfson Research Merit Award holders
Whitehead Prize winners
Clay Research Award recipients
1973 births
Topologists
Simons Investigator
University of Belgrade alumni
Sadleirian Professors of Pure Mathematics
California Institute of Technology faculty
Stony Brook University faculty
Academics of the University of Warwick
University of Minnesota faculty
21st-century American mathematicians